KGLH-LP (96.9 FM) is a radio station licensed to Spicer, Minnesota, United States.  The station is currently owned by Hope Presbyterian Church and broadcasts religious programming including music as well as live broadcast of church services.

References

External links

 

Low-power FM radio stations in Minnesota
Christian radio stations in Minnesota